Philip R. Brown  (born 6 February 1963 in Sydney) is an internationally recognised and presented higher education leader, administrator and educator with extensive experience in providing independent advice to governments, school systems and other educational entities within the United States, Australia and the United Kingdom. Dr Brown has served as CEO, Institute of Health & Management and Executive Director, Health Careers International, as Dean, Le Cordon Bleu Australia; as CEO & Academic Director, UC College at the University of Canberra, Australia; and as Principal (President) & CEO, Newbold College of Higher Education, Binfield, Bracknell, UK. ](2011–2014). Brown was recognised and presented as a Principal Fellow of the Higher Education Academy (now Advance HE) (the highest category of HEA Fellowship in the UK) in 2013 for his very extensive experience in leading, as well as delivering, learning and teaching in higher education. In 2009 he was recognised as a Fellow by the Australian College of Educators (the only national association in Australia representing educators across all sectors and systems) "for innovative leadership in establishing teaching as a profession through roles as author, consultant, teacher, assistant principal, principal and president of a professional association."
Brown now lives in Sydney with his wife Sharyn, daughter Tuscany and son Jarvis.

Early life and education 
Born in Sydney to Reg and Mavis Brown, Brown is the eldest of two children. He attended schools in Perth, Western Australia and Melbourne, Victoria before studying Geography and Economics (BEd) at Avondale University College (1982–1986). He then studied Commerce (MCom) at the University of New South Wales (1991–1993) and Educational Administration (MEdAdmin) at the University of New South Wales (1993–1994). Brown completed a Doctor of Education (EdD) in 1997 at La Sierra University in southern California, USA, researching administrative stress and job burnout in educational leaders across the United States. In 2010 he became one of the first higher education administrators in Australia to complete the Master of Tertiary Education Management (MTEM) program through the LH Martin Institute, located within the University of Melbourne.

Career 
Brown has served as CEO, Institute of Health and Management- and previously as Dean, Le Cordon Bleu Australia; CEO and Academic Director, UC College at the University of Canberra, ACT, Australia and as  Principal and Chief Executive of Newbold College of Higher Education. UK – a member of the worldwide network of 118 Adventist colleges and universities – and an international learning community attracting students from over 50 countries to its Berkshire campus. College development under his leadership included campus refurbishment, student life initiatives, a new certificate in health and wellness, and admission to the Adventist Colleges Abroad consortium.

Brown also has served previously as Vice-President (Learning & Teaching) of Australia's newest university, Avondale University, Australia where he worked collaboratively to create and successfully engage academic staff in strategies to enhance Avondale's reputation for providing quality learning and teaching. Prior to this he was Executive Principal of the international pathways college to the Western Sydney University where he worked with staff, the University and the Board to plan the strategic relocation of the College's operations to create the first campus at an Australian university devoted exclusively to the first-year experience.

Brown's extensive experience in senior management and leadership roles also includes Director of Education for an international online learning company based in Chicago, USA; General Manager for an educational publisher based in Sydney, Australia; and Director of Studies for a large, independent, Anglican, co-educational college where he guided the strategic planning process of becoming a K-12 college by contributing forward-thinking curriculum and middle years of schooling ideas and discussion papers based on national and international research about emerging best practice in organisational structures, curriculum design and pedagogy.

Brown has extensive education consulting experience within the public and private sectors and has project-managed high-stakes assessment and reporting projects for the Office of the Board of Studies (now NSW Education Standards Authority), the peak K-12 curriculum, assessment and reporting authority in New South Wales, Australia. Brown started his career as a secondary school economics and commerce teacher at Sydney Adventist College, Strathfield, NSW, Australia and then The Scots College, Bellevue Hill, NSW, Australia before accepting a scholarship to pursue doctoral studies in the United States.

Publications 
 Brown, P. (2012), Improving and growing yourself to improve, grow and serve your organisation. Leadership Development Journal, 2012 pp47–49 
 Brown, P. (2012) There is no "I” in T-E-A-M-W-O-R-K"! Leadership Development Journal, 2012, pp86–89 
 Northcote, M., Seddon, J., & Brown, P. (2012). Benchmark yourself: Self-reflecting about online teaching. In G. Williams, P. Statham, N.Brown & B. Cleland (Eds.) Changing Demands, Changing Directions, Proceedings from ASCILITE Hobart 2011. (pp904–908)
 Brown, P., Dixon, T. & Macauley, M., (2001) Business Studies Year 12 HSC Course (textbook) Leading Edge Education, Sydney. 
 Brown, P., Dixon, T., & Driver, T., (2001) Australia in the Global Economy (workbook) Leading Edge Education, Sydney. 
 Brown, P., Dixon, T., & Macauley, M., (2001) A Student Guide to the New HSC Business Studies Exam Leading Edge Education, Sydney. 
 Brown, P., Dixon, T., & Macauley, M., (2001) A Student Guide to the New HSC Economics Exam Leading Edge Education, Sydney. 
 Brown, P., Dhall, M., & Dixon, T., (2001) Business Management and Change HSC Business Studies Topic 1 (HSC Business Studies Model Answer Series) Leading Edge Education, Sydney. 
 Brown, P., Dhall, M., & Dixon, T., (2001) Financial Planning and Management HSC Business Studies Topic 2 (HSC Business Studies Model Answer Series) Leading Edge Education, Sydney. 
 Brown, P., Dhall, M., & Dixon, T., (2001) Marketing HSC Business Studies Topic 3 (HSC Business Studies Model Answer Series) Leading Edge Education, Sydney. 
 Brown, P., Dhall, M., & Dixon, T., (2001) Employment Relations HSC Business Studies Topic 4 (HSC Business Studies Model Answer Series) Leading Edge Education, Sydney. 
 Brown, P., Dhall, M., & Dixon, T., (2001) Global Business HSC Business Studies Topic 5 (HSC Business Studies Model Answer Series) Leading Edge Education, Sydney. 
 Brown, P., Dixon, T., & Driver, T., (2001) The Global Economy Topic 1 (HSC Economics Model Answer Series) Leading Edge Education, Sydney. 
 Brown, P., Dixon, T., & Driver, T., (2001) Australia’s Place in the Global Economy Topic 2 (HSC Economics Model Answer Series) Leading Edge Education, Sydney. 
 Brown, P., Dixon, T., & Driver, T., (2001) Economic Issues Topic 3 (HSC Economics Model Answer Series) Leading Edge Education, Sydney. 
 Brown, P., Dixon, T., & Driver, T., (2001) Economic Policies and Management Topic 4 (HSC Economics Model Answer Series) Leading Edge Education, Sydney.

Awards 
 2019 Fellow, Governance Institute of Australia
 2018 Certified Practising Risk Associate, Risk Management Institution of Australasia
 2013 Principal Fellow, Higher Education Academy (UK) “for your very extensive experience in leading, as well as delivering, learning and teaching in higher education.”
 2013 Fellow, Association of University Administrators (UK)  “for your substantial commitment to the continuing professional development of others, and the impact and influence this has had on higher education administration and management.”
 2013 Fellow, Chartered Management Institute (UK)
 2013 Honoured Alumni Award, School of Education, La Sierra University (USA)
 2011 NSW Service Award, Australian College of Educators (Australia)
 2009 Fellow, Australian College of Educators (the only national association in Australia representing educators across all sectors and systems) "for innovative leadership in establishing teaching as a profession through roles as author, consultant, teacher, assistant principal, principal and president of a professional association." 
 2008 Fellow, Australian Institute of Management (Australia’s largest professional body for managers) in 2008 “for your record of proven management achievement exceeding six years in a general executive management role.”

References

External links 
 https://independent.academia.edu/PhilipBrown4
 http://www.newbold.ac.uk/article/536/about-us/meet-the-principal-dr-philip-r-brown
 Phil Brown – 5 May 2012 on Vimeo
 Phil Brown – 6 October 2012 on Vimeo
 https://web.archive.org/web/20170107231324/http://www.lhmartininstitute.edu.au/

1963 births
Living people
Australian consultants
Australian educators
Principal Fellows of the Higher Education Academy